Pilar, officially the Municipality of Pilar (Surigaonon: Lungsod nan Pilar), is a 5th class municipality in the province of Surigao del Norte, Philippines. According to the 2020 census, it has a population of 10,374 people.

It is located on Siargao Island, bounded by the municipality of San Isidro to the north, municipality of Del Carmen to the west, municipality of Dapa to south and Philippine Sea to the east. It used to be a barrio of Dapa until its creation as a separate municipality on October 31, 1953, by virtue of Executive Order No. 638 issued by then President Elpidio Quirino. Pilar has a natural harbor through a small inlet called Port Pilar.

Geography

Barangays
Pilar is politically subdivided into 15 barangays, listed here with 2010 populations.
Town Proper Barangays (Poblacion)
 Asinan - 937
 Centro - 343
 Pilaring - 851
 Punta - 381

Outlying Barangays
 Caridad - 1,456
 Consolacion - 200
 Datu - 570
 Dayaohay - 350
 Jaboy - 265
 Katipunan - 547
 Maasin - 1,001
 Mabini - 286
 Mabuhay - 455
 Salvacion - 772
 San Roque - 1,042

Climate

Demographics

Religion
Almost all inhabitant are Christians and majority follows Roman Catholicism. Pilar is a parish under the Roman Catholic Diocese of Surigao. The town got its name from its patron saint, Our Lady of the Pillar.

Language
Surigaonon is the local language. Cebuano, Filipino and English are also understood.

Economy

The town's economy is largely based on fishing and agriculture. Major agricultural produce are rice and coconut (copra).

Tourism
Various homestay facilities are available in town for tourists.

Magpupungko Lagoons and Rock Formations

Magpupungko is the most popular tourist destination in Pilar. It is famous for its lagoons which can only be seen during low tide. It also features picturesque limestone rock formations.

Other Beaches and Rock Formations
Other areas that can be explored by tourists are Taglungnan Beach and Tagbayanga Islets, which are across town proper and can be reach in 15–20 minutes by boat ride. Other beaches are Lukod Beach and Caridad Beach.

Surfing

Pilar is also one of the surfing spots in Siargao and is less crowded. It is one and a half hour boat ride from General Luna, where the more popular surfing spot Cloud 9 is located. It holds many good lefts and is best surfed during NE swells. There are good breaks in front and near the town proper and in Barangay Caridad.

Game Fishing
Pilar is popular to game fishing enthusiasts. The town hosts an annual invitational sport fishing event dubbed as Siargao International Game Fishing Tournament.

Mangrove Forest
Pilar has an extensive mangrove forest reserve.

Philippine Freshwater Crocodile

Thirty-six Philippine freshwater crocodile (Crocodylus mindorensis) were released in Paghongawan Marsh (misspelled by media as Paghowangan) in Barangay Jaboy last March 2013 as part of conservation effort to bolster the population of this endangered reptile. The released crocodiles are all yearlings and were bred in captivity. The marsh extends 300 acres (120 hectares) in the dry season and more than 1,500 acres (600 hectares) in the wet season. These crocodiles are not endemic to Siargao and are smaller compared to saltwater crocodiles which can be found in the western side of Siargao, in the mangrove forest of Del Carmen town.

Infrastructure

Transportation

Pilar is connected to Surigao City through the Port of Dapa. Jeepneys ply between Pilar and Dapa daily. It is connected to Cebu City and Metro Manila through Sayak Airport in the adjacent Municipality of Del Carmen. Habal-habal (motorcycle) can also be rented to service transportation needs.

Healthcare

Pilar has a district hospital but now mostly serve lying-in and maternity services. There is also a rural health center in the town proper.

Telecommunications
The Philippine Long Distance Telephone Company provides fixed line services. Wireless mobile communications services are provided by Smart Communications and Globe Telecommunications.

Education

Pilar is served by 2 high schools, Pilar National High School in the town proper and Pilar National High School - Caridad Annex in its biggest barangay, Caridad. There are also 12 elementary schools led by Pilar Central Elementary School.

References

External links

 Pilar Profile at PhilAtlas.com
   Pilar Profile at the DTI Cities and Municipalities Competitive Index
 [ Philippine Standard Geographic Code]

Municipalities of Surigao del Norte
Establishments by Philippine executive order